The Sylvania Mountains Wilderness is a federally designated wilderness area located  east of Bishop in the state of California. The wilderness is 18,677acres in size and is managed by the Bureau of Land Management (BLM).  The California Desert Protection Act of 1994 created the Sylvania Mountains Wilderness and was added to the National Wilderness Preservation System. The wilderness is bordered by Nevada stateline on the east, Piper Mountain Wilderness on the west and Death Valley National Park to the south.

Geography
The Sylvania Mountains are a subrange of the Last Chance Mountains and straddle the California-Nevada border. There is no distinct crest, only rounded summits and ridges with many canyons, drainages and bahadas (fans of alluvial soil that have combined at the base of canyons).

Flora and fauna
There are limited water sources, but the springs that do exist  support mule deer, desert bighorn sheep, chukar, coyote, as well as ground squirrels and lizards.

The wilderness flora is a mixture of Mojave Desert and Great Basin plant life.  Joshua trees are numerous, as well as desert tea, hop sage, cheesebush, deerhorn cholla and in the highest elevations, single-leaf pinyon, big sagebrush and Utah juniper. Rare plants in the area include fernleaf fleabane (Erigeron compactus), a native perennial wildflower, and Mormon needlegrass (Achnatherum aridum), a native perennial that grows in Joshua Tree and Pinyon-juniper woodland communities.

Recreation
The hiking trails are closed four-wheel-drive roads and rise gradually from the bahada to pinyon woodlands in the higher elevations. The wilderness is very seldom visited due to a lack of water and extreme temperatures in the summer months. Wildflower season is from March through May.

Relics of mining activity are still present both within the wilderness and along the mountain range into Nevada.

See also
 Piper Mountain Wilderness
 Death Valley National Park
 Pack it in, pack it out
 Environmental ethics

References

 
 http://www.blm.gov/ca/st/en/fo/ridgecrest/wilderness/sylvania_mountains.html

External links
Sylvania Mountains Wilderness - BLM
 
 

Protected areas of Inyo County, California
Wilderness areas of California
Protected areas of the Mojave Desert
Bureau of Land Management areas in California